Rubáiyát is a compilation album, released in 1990 to commemorate the 40th anniversary of the Elektra record label. The concept was to feature present-day Elektra artists covering songs from the historic catalogue of recordings of Elektra Records and its sister label Asylum Records.

Two long-running Elektra artists—Jackson Browne and The Cure—were featured in a double capacity.  They were featured as performing artists (covering songs from Elektra's early canon) and were also represented by having songs that they had recorded for Elektra, covered by newer Elektra artists. Carly Simon was the only solo artist to have two songs covered on the collection while the Eagles were the only group to share that distinction.

A promotional version was also released featuring not only the commercially released version of the album, but also a second version featuring each recording in its original incarnation.  Another promotional release was a five-song EP consisting of songs from the album redone by John Oswald using his Plunderphonics techniques.  The EP's first track, "O'Hell", combined snippets of the original version of "Hello, I Love You", the cover by The Cure contained on this release, plus 17 other songs by The Doors.

The double album was produced by Lenny Kaye, guitarist of the Patti Smith group, who also wrote the liner notes.


Track listing

Disc 1

Disc 2

References

1990 compilation albums
Covers albums
Elektra Records compilation albums
Rock compilation albums
Albums produced by Lenny Kaye